The 2000 IAAF Grand Prix was the sixteenth edition of the annual global series of one-day track and field competitions organized by the International Association of Athletics Federations (IAAF). The series was divided into four levels: 2000 IAAF Golden League, Grand Prix I and Grand Prix II, and IAAF Permit Meetings. There were seven Golden League meetings, Grand Prix I featured 9 meetings from 13 May to 5 August and Grand Prix II featured 10 meetings from 2 March to 3 September, making a combined total of 26 meetings for the series. An additional 13 IAAF Outdoor Permit Meetings were attached to the circuit.

Compared to the previous season, the South African meet was moved from Roodepoort to Pretoria, and the Pontiac Grand Prix Invitational and IAAF Meeting Zagreb were included for the first time. The Tsiklitiria meet was promoted to Grand Prix I status. Four meetings were dropped from the calendar: the Qatar International Athletic Meet (not held that year), the St. Louis US Open Meet, the Meeting Gaz de France Saint-Denis and Weltklasse in Köln.

Performances on designated events on the circuit earned athletes points which qualified them for entry to the 2000 IAAF Grand Prix Final, held on 5 October in Doha, Qatar. Javelin thrower Trine Hattestad was the points leader for the series, taking 110 points from eight meetings. This was the second highest total ever for the circuit and the first time a woman led the rankings. The highest scoring male athlete was hurdler Angelo Taylor, who scored 101 points. Americans Marion Jones and Gail Devers were the other athletes to amass over 100 points, each with a total of 104.

Meetings

Points standings

Overall men

Overall women

References

Points standings
2000 GRAND PRIX STANDINGS - Overall Men. IAAF. Retrieved 2019-08-31.
2000 GRAND PRIX STANDINGS - Overall Women. IAAF. Retrieved 2019-08-31. 

2000
IAAF Grand Prix